Palatine German Frame House is a historic home located at Herkimer in Herkimer County, New York. It is a -story, rectangular, gable-roofed, heavy timber-frame building, five bays wide and two bays deep.  It measures approximately 39 feet by 23 feet.  It was built after the middle of the 18th century.

It was listed on the National Register of Historic Places in 2004.

References

Houses on the National Register of Historic Places in New York (state)
Houses completed in 1760
Houses in Herkimer County, New York
Palatine German settlement in New York (state)
National Register of Historic Places in Herkimer County, New York